The 1823 Alabama gubernatorial election was held on August 4, 1823, to elect the governor of Alabama. Democratic-Republican incumbent Israel Pickens defeated fellow Democratic-Republican Henry H. Chambers with 55.85% of the vote. Pickens and Chambers had both contested the 1821 election as Democratic-Republicans as well.

General election

Candidates
Israel Pickens, Alabama governor since 1821, US Representative for North Carolina 1811–1817
Henry H. Chambers, Delegate to the Alabama Constitutional Convention and Alabama House member in 1820

Results

County results

References

Alabama gubernatorial elections
Alabama
1823 Alabama elections
August 1823 events